Montichiari is a town and comune in the province of Brescia, in Lombardy. It received the honorary title of city with a presidential decree on December 27, 1991.
The town is home to the Gabriele D'Annunzio airport (Italian: Aeroporto Gabriele D'Annunzio), the fair center Centro Fiera del Garda and the Bonoris castle (Italian: Castello Bonoris).

Giovanni Treccani, publisher of the eponymous encyclopedia, was born in Montichiari.

Twin towns
Montichiari is twinned with:

  Gambettola, Italy
  Pescara, Italy

Sources

Cities and towns in Lombardy